Alarm at Midnight or Help! Armed Assault! is a 1931 German thriller film directed by Johannes Meyer and starring Hans Stüwe, Hans Brausewetter, and Otto Wallburg.

The film's sets were designed by the art director Alexander Ferenczy.

Cast
 Hans Stüwe as Kriminalkommissar Bremer
 Hans Brausewetter as Kriminalkommissar Braun
 Otto Wallburg as Karl Matthes
 Gerda Maurus as Irene Matthes, seine Nichte
 Eva Schmid-Kayser as Else Moll
 Hermann Vallentin as Kriminalrat Kipping
 Veit Harlan as Otto Weigandt - genannt der 'Schränker'
 Bruno Lopinski as Kriminalkommissar Hartmann
 Hugo Fischer-Köppe as Matrosen-Emil
 Harry Nestor as Artisten-Fredy
 Ludwig Stössel as Der Varieté-Agent
 Siegfried Berisch as Pensionsgast
 Rudolf van der Noss as Kriminalassistent
 Georg Guertler as Mitglied der drei Bandinis
 Rudolf Hilberg as Mitglied der drei Bandinis
 Otto Reinwald as Mitglied der drei Bandinis
 Fritz Schmuck as Diener bei Matthes

References

Bibliography

External links 
 

1931 films
1930s thriller films
Films of the Weimar Republic
German thriller films
1930s German-language films
Films directed by Johannes Meyer
German black-and-white films
1930s German films